Uncle Sam Magoo is a 1970 television special directed by Abe Levitow, written by Larry Markes, Henry G. Saperstein and Sam Rosen, and musical score by Walter Scharf. The special stars Jim Backus as Mr. Magoo, Lennie Weinrib, Bob Holt, Patti Gilbert, Sid Grossfeld and Barney Phillips. The special aired on February 15, 1970, on NBC.

Plot
Mr. Magoo goes to Hollywood to get a part in a film, but instead witnesses the history of the United States firsthand in a series of adventures that take place in different time periods.

Cast
Jim Backus as the voice of Mr. Magoo
Lennie Weinrib - Uncle Sam, Miles Standish, John Alden, Paul Revere, Davy Crockett, Captain John Parker, Daniel Webster, John F. Kennedy
Bob Holt - Chief Strong Eagle, Indian Chief, John Smith, Chief Powhatan, Indian Chief 2, Kit Carson, Paul Bunyan
Patti Gilbert - Priscilla Mullins, Betsy Ross, Tom Sawyer, Eleanor Roosevelt
Sid Grossfeld
Barney Phillips - Mark Twain, John Sutter, Patrick Henry, Abraham Lincoln, Martin Luther King Jr.
Dave Shelley
John Himes
Bill Clayton

Reception
DVD Verdict gave the special a positive review, saying, "Eschewing rah-rah jingoism in favor of explosive color, unforced humor, and majestic choral arrangements of American musical standards, this patriotic tribute to the U.S.A. was clearly a labor of love for all involved, and the feeling is infectious. A veritable cornucopia of sight and sound sensations, Uncle Sam Magoo is this collection's crowning achievement."  DVD Talk called it a "bizarre bit of Nixon-era patriotism".

References

External links
 

1970 television specials
NBC television specials
American animated short films
American television films
Animation based on real people
Films directed by Abe Levitow
Films scored by Walter Scharf
1970s American animated films
1970 films